Nathan Michael Thompson (born 9 November 1990) is an English professional footballer who plays as a defender for League One side Peterborough United.

Career

Swindon Town
Thompson was born in Chester, Cheshire. He began his career with Swindon Town, moving from the youth set-up to become a professional in April 2009. Even before he signed the two-year deal he had reportedly received interest from Premier League sides Arsenal, Tottenham Hotspur, Everton and Newcastle United. He made his debut on 5 October 2010, as he replaced Scott Cuthbert in a Football League Trophy win over Torquay United. He made his league debut on 2 November 2010, when he played the full ninety minutes of a 3–0 home defeat to Charlton Athletic.

On 20 April 2013, Thompson was awarded the 2012/2013 Swindon Advertiser 'Player of the Year' after winning by more than 60 per cent of the fans' votes and Thompson won again in 2013/2014.

Portsmouth
On 22 June 2017, Thompson signed for newly promoted League One club Portsmouth on a two-year contract on a free transfer. He scored his first goal for Portsmouth against Sunderland in the 2019 EFL Trophy Final in which Portsmouth won on penalties. Thompson left after his contract expired in search for Championship football.

Personal life
His younger brother, Louis, is also a footballer.
Nathan is studying for an MSc in Sports Directorship with VSI in Manchester vsiee.com/msc-sports-directorship

Career statistics

Honours

Club
Portsmouth
EFL Trophy: 2018–19

Club
Peterborough United
Olympic Gold - Diving

References

External links
Profile at the Portsmouth F.C. website

1990 births
Living people
Sportspeople from Chester
English footballers
Association football defenders
Swindon Town F.C. players
Portsmouth F.C. players
English Football League players
Black British sportsmen
Peterborough United F.C. players